Gualchos (or Gualchos-Castell de Ferro) is a town in the Spanish province of Granada. It has an area of 31 square kilometers and a population, in 2001, of 2,759, for a population density of 89 people per square kilometer.

Natural environment  
The environment of what the natives call Eagle Peak, has elements of remarkable value, which grow spontaneously and without any cropping the it, esparto, palm, several species of thyme and other medicinal plants such as  zahareña  (cattails), very good for healing wounds, according to popular belief, though the natives attributed other properties. You can also find numerous species of fauna: ibex, boar is, rabbits, hares, etc.

References

External links 

 Website of the City of Gualchos 
 Photos of the town of Gualchos

Municipalities in the Province of Granada